FC Kuressaare U21 is the reserve team of Estonian football club FC Kuressaare, playing in the town of Kuressaare.

Current squad

 As of 24 August 2013.

References

External links
Team at Estonian Football Association

2002 establishments in Estonia
Estonian reserve football teams
FC Kuressaare